Pedapudi or Peddapudi is a village and a Mandal in Kakinada district in the state of Andhra Pradesh in India.

Geography

It has an average elevation of 7 meters (26 feet).

Important facts about Pedapudi
It is a typical Kakinada beautiful pastoral village with full of paddy fields as far as eye can see.
It is a nodal Mandal centre and 18 surrounding villages come under it.

Major landmarks
Ramalayam/market area/Bus station
Kama cheruvu
Gandhi memorial high school
Gandhi bomma centre
Police station
State bank of India
Government hospital
Chandrika Cloth stores

See also 
 :Ganti Pedapudi

References 

Villages in Kakinada district